This list is of the Places of Scenic Beauty of Japan located within the Prefecture of Nagano.

National Places of Scenic Beauty
As of 1 January 2021, six Places have been designated at a national level (including one *Special Place of Scenic Beauty).

Prefectural Places of Scenic Beauty
As of 23 December 2020, six Places have been designated at a prefectural level.

Municipal Places of Scenic Beauty
As of 1 May 2020, eighty-two Places have been designated at a municipal level.

Registered Places of Scenic Beauty
As of 1 January 2021, nine Monuments have been registered (as opposed to designated) as Places of Scenic Beauty at a national level.

See also
 Cultural Properties of Japan
 List of parks and gardens of Nagano Prefecture
 List of Historic Sites of Japan (Nagano)

References

External links
  Cultural Properties in Nagano Prefecture

Tourist attractions in Nagano Prefecture
Places of Scenic Beauty

ja:Category:長野県にある国指定の名勝